Western Trunk line is a railway line of the Taiwan Railways Administration in western Taiwan. It is by far the busiest line, having served over 171 million passengers in 2016. The total length of the line is 404.5 km.

The line is an official classification of physical tracks and does not correspond to particular services. It is connected to Taichung line (mountain line) at Zhunan and Changhua. Many services turn inland to take the Taichung route, then reconnect back to the main line (West Coast line). Train schedules and departure boards mark either mountain or coastal line to indicate the route taken.

History
The original railroad between Keelung and Twatutia was completed in 1891. The section between Twatutia and Hsinchu was finished in 1893. However, in the Japanese era, these sections were all rebuilt by the Government-General of Taiwan as part of its Taiwan Trunk Railway (Jūkan Tetsudō) project. The Taiwan Trunk Railway was completed in 1908 with route from Kīrun (Keelung) through Taihoku (Taipei), Shinchiku (Hsinchu), Taichū (Taichung), Tainan (Tainan), to Takao (Kaohsiung).

The Taiwan Trunk Railway at that time went through all major cities in western Taiwan. However, the terrain around Taichū (Taichung) created a significant bottleneck for rail freight transport. To resolve this issue, the Government-General of Taiwan decided to build a Coastal Line (Kaigan-sen) between Chikunan (Zhunan) and Shōka (Changhua) to relieve the congestion. The construction of the Coastal Line was started in 1919 and completed in 1922. The Coastal Line then became a part of the main West Coast Line, and the original railway through Taichū (Taichung) was named as a separate line (Taichung line).

Due to service patterns, the following lines are often collectively referred to as the Western main line

Stations

Notes

References

1891 establishments in Taiwan
TRA routes
Railway lines opened in 1891
3 ft 6 in gauge railways in Taiwan